Don Bosco Institute of Technology is a private engineering college situated at Kurla (West), Mumbai affiliated with the University of Mumbai. It has been granted a "Religious Minority" Status (Roman Catholics).

History
In 2005, the college was ranked 84 in the list of top technical colleges in India in a Dataquest-IDC-NASSCOM Survey.

Degree programs

The college, under the University of Mumbai, offers bachelor's degrees in engineering in the following programs:

 Mechanical engineering - 120 seats
 Electronics and telecommunications engineering - 60 seats
 Computer engineering - 60 seats
 Information technology - 60 seats

The program is divided into 8 semesters spread over 4 years. Granted a religious minority quota, 51% of all seats are reserved for Roman Catholics.

Extracurricular activities and festivals

The College has an annual inter-college technical festival organized by the student committee which is called "Colosseum".  In 2016, the college started "Hysteria,” which is the cultural and sports mega fest for all the institutions that come under DBCL. At the end of even semester, each year the final year students have 'Innovex' where they showcase their final year projects.

The college also organizes Teknack, a 2-day inter-collegiate online technical festival.  It started off as a intra college online festival, and is organised every year in the month of February.

See also
 Don Bosco College of Engineering

References

Salesian schools
Educational institutions established in 2001
Engineering colleges in Mumbai
Affiliates of the University of Mumbai
All India Council for Technical Education
Catholic universities and colleges in India
2001 establishments in Maharashtra